Dayshalee Salamán (born 17 August 1990) is a Puerto Rican basketball player for Obras Sanitarias and the Puerto Rican national team.

She participated at the 2018 FIBA Women's Basketball World Cup. She is openly lesbian.

References

External links

1990 births
Living people
Basketball players at the 2019 Pan American Games
Basketball players at the 2020 Summer Olympics
Guards (basketball)
Olympic basketball players of Puerto Rico
Pan American Games medalists in basketball
People from Carolina, Puerto Rico
Puerto Rican expatriates in Mexico
Puerto Rican women's basketball players
Pan American Games bronze medalists for Puerto Rico
Medalists at the 2019 Pan American Games
Puerto Rican LGBT sportspeople
21st-century LGBT people